Gina Lückenkemper (born 21 November 1996) is a German track and field athlete who competes in the sprints. She won gold medals in the 100 metres and for the 4 × 100 m relay at the 2022 European Athletics Championships.

As a 18-year-old Lückenkemper took gold in the 200 metres at the 2015 European Junior Championships. She has competed at the World Athletics Championships in 2015, 2017, 2019 and 2022 and at the 2016 Rio and 2020 Tokyo Olympics. She won several German national titles.

At the 2017 World Championships in London, Lückenkemper broke for the first time the 11-second barrier in the heats of the 100 m event with her time of 10.95 seconds, becoming the first German female sprinter to achieve the feat since Katrin Krabbe in 1991. All five women placed ahead of Lückenkemper on the German all-time list ran their best times in the 1980s in East Germany jerseys.

For her 2022 season, she was voted German Sportswoman of the Year.

Achievements

International competitions

* Abbreviations: h = heat (Q, q), sf = semi-final

Circuit wins, and National championships
 Diamond League
 2019: Zürich Weltklasse (4 x 100 m relay)
 German Athletics Championships titles
 100 metres: 2017, 2018, 2022
 200 metres: 2016
 German Indoor Athletics Championships titles
 60 metres: 2017
 4 x 200 m relay: 2017

Personal bests
 60 metres indoor – 7.11 (Dortmund 2018)
 100 metres – 10.95 (+1.3 m/s, London 2017)
 200 metres – 22.67 (0.0 m/s, Regensburg 2016)
 200 metres indoor – 23.69 (Halle 2014)

References

External links

 

1996 births
Living people
German female sprinters
World Athletics Championships athletes for Germany
Sportspeople from Hamm
Athletes (track and field) at the 2016 Summer Olympics
Athletes (track and field) at the 2020 Summer Olympics
Olympic athletes of Germany
Olympic female sprinters
20th-century German women
21st-century German women
European Athletics Championships winners